Jason is a hero of Greek mythology who led the Argonauts and married Medea.

Jason or JASON may also refer to:

Names
Jason (given name)
Jason (surname)

Entertainment 
 Jason Voorhees, the primary antagonist of the Friday the 13th franchise
 Jason and the Argonauts (1963 film)
 Jason and the Argonauts (miniseries)

Places
Jason, North Carolina
Jason Islands, Falkland Islands

Transport
HMS Jason, several ships in the Royal Navy
Jason (ship), Norwegian whaling vessel
USS Jason (AC-12), 1912–1936
USS Jason (AR-8), US Navy repair ship 1944–1995

Exploration science
Jason (rocket), sounding rocket launched in 1958
Jason (ROV), unmanned submersible robot developed by Robert Ballard
Jason Jr., prototype of the Jason robot submersible used to explore the wreck of the RMS Titanic
Jason satellite series (Joint Altimetry Satellite Oceanography Network), a series of oceanographic radar altimeter satellites
Jason-1, satellite altimeter used to measure the ocean surface topography, deactivated 2013
Jason-2, satellite altimeter, successor to Jason-1
Jason-3, satellite altimeter, successor to Jason-2
Jason, crater on Phoebe, one of Saturn's moons

Other
JASON (advisory group), American defense-oriented consulting group
Jason (cartoonist) (born 1965), cartoonist (pen name of John Arne Sæterøy)
Jason (opera), a 1696 opera by Pascal Collasse, libretto by Jean-Baptiste Rousseau
JASON Project, high school science advocacy program
JASON reactor, nuclear reactor in Greenwich, London, England
Jason of Thessalonica

See also

 J Son (disambiguation) including JSON